Steve McKichan (born May 29, 1967) is a Canadian former professional ice hockey goaltender. Drafted out of Miami University by the Vancouver Canucks in the 1988 NHL Supplemental Draft, McKichan played one game in the National Hockey League with the Canucks in the 1990–91 season, playing for one period on December 5, 1990 against the New Jersey Devils and allowing two goals on eight shots.

In December 1990, McKichan suffered a career-ending neck injury while playing with the Milwaukee Admirals of the International Hockey League.

McKichan worked as a goaltending coach with the Toronto Maple Leafs during the 2006–07 season.  he owns and operates a hockey school in Strathroy.

Career statistics

Regular season and playoffs

See also
List of players who played only one game in the NHL

References

External links

1967 births
Canadian ice hockey coaches
Canadian ice hockey goaltenders
Ice hockey people from Ontario
Living people
Miami RedHawks men's ice hockey players
Milwaukee Admirals (IHL) players
National Hockey League supplemental draft picks
People from Strathroy-Caradoc
Toronto Maple Leafs coaches
Vancouver Canucks draft picks
Vancouver Canucks players
Virginia Lancers players